Wales Airport may refer to:

 Wales Airport (Alaska) in Wales, Alaska, United States (FAA: IWK)
 Wales Airport (Maine) in Wales, Maine, United States (FAA: ME6)
 Cardiff International Airport in Cardiff, Wales, United Kingdom (IATA: CWL, ICAO: EGFF)